The Singapore Armed Forces National Service Medal is an award conferred on a National Serviceman (NSman) of the Singapore Armed Forces (SAF) who has completed an equivalent 10 years of active service. This is achieved by meaningfully and satisfactorily completed 90% of the National Service Training System (NSTS) - 6 High-Key In-Camp Trainings and 3 Low-Key In-Camp Trainings.

Regular members of the SAF qualify for an equivalent medal, the Singapore Armed Forces Long Service and Good Conduct (10 Years) Medal.

A clasp is awarded for an additional equivalent 5 years of service, for a total of 15 years. This is met by the full NSTS - 8 High-Key In-Camp Trainings and 5 Low-Key In-Camp Trainings.

Description

 The ribbon is red, with three central white stripes.

Service medals
In the SAF National Service, the medals for service are:
  5 years - Singapore Armed Forces Good Service Medal
 10 years - Singapore Armed Forces National Service Medal
 15 years - Singapore Armed Forces National Service Medal with 15 year clasp
 20 years - Singapore Armed Forces Long Service and Good Conduct (20 Years) Medal
 25 years - Long Service Medal (Military)
 30 years - Singapore Armed Forces Long Service and Good Conduct (20 Years) Medal with 30 year clasp

References
Singapore MINDEF Factsheet: Review of SAF medals
Singaporean Army Medals Factsheet

Military awards and decorations of Singapore
Long service medals